Ceratothalama is a monotypic snout moth genus. Its only species, Ceratothalama argosema, is known from Fiji. Both the genus and species were first described by Edward Meyrick in 1932.

References

Moths described in 1932
Tirathabini
Monotypic moth genera
Moths of Fiji
Pyralidae genera